Psoralea argophylla (common name silverleaf Indian breadroot) is a species of legume in the family Fabaceae. The species is native to the central United States, as well as the three Canadian prairie provinces, Alberta, Saskatchewan, and Manitoba. Psoralea argophylla grows naturally on forb, and it grows perennially.

References

Psoraleeae